Charles Léon Stephen Sauvestre (26 December 1847 – 18 June 1919) was a French architect. He is notable for being one of the architects contributing to the design of the world-famous Eiffel Tower, built for the 1889 Universal Exposition in Paris, France.

Early life

Sauvestre was born in Bonnétable, Sarthe in France in 1847. His father Charles Sauvestre was a writer, socialist, activist and teacher and his mother was a housewife. He graduated with first class honors from École Spéciale d'Architecture in 1868. He died in 1919.

Career

Sauvestre contributed to the design of the Eiffel Tower, adding the decorative arches to the base, a glass pavilion to the first level and the cupola at the top. He also chose the color of the tower. He received the support of Gustave Eiffel who bought the rights to the patent on the design which he had filed together with Maurice Koechlin and Émile Nouguier.
He was also the head of the Architecture department Compagnie des Etablissements Eiffel

Notable projects 

 1878: Gas Pavilion, Expo, Paris
 1879: National School of Chemistry Mulhouse, Kennedy Avenue, Mulhouse
 1876: Hotel Seyrig in Paris
 1881: House 61 Rue Ampere
 1884: Maison d'Albert Menier 
 1884: Hotel Beranger
 1887 - 1889: Eiffel tower
 1889: Galerie des Machines
 1900 - 1902: Chateaux 
 1905 - 1908: Ancienne usine Menier
 1906: Menier Chocolate Factory

See also
 Exposition Universelle (1889)
 Eiffel Tower
 Maurice Koechlin
 Émile Nouguier
 Alexandre Gustave Eiffel

References

External links

 Stephen Sauvestre: The forgotten architect of the Eiffel Tower
 Official website of the Eiffel Tower 
 
 3D render of the Eiffel Tower for use in Google Earth

1847 births
People from Sarthe
1919 deaths
7th arrondissement of Paris
19th-century French architects
20th-century French architects
Eiffel Tower
École Spéciale d'Architecture alumni